Hydria was a town of ancient Greece on the island of Paros.

Its site is located on Paros.

References

Populated places in the ancient Aegean islands
Former populated places in Greece
Paros